Hygrotus novemlineatus  is a species of Dytiscidae native to Europe.

References

Hygrotus
Beetles described in 1829
Beetles of Europe